Athletics events were contested at the 1977 Summer Universiade in Sofia, Bulgaria between 19 and 23 August.

Medal summary

Men's events

Women's events

Medal table

References
World Student Games (Universiade - Men) - GBR Athletics (Archived)
World Student Games (Universiade - Women) - GBR Athletics (Archived)

 
Athletics at the Summer Universiade
Uni
1977 Summer Universiade
1977 Universiade